Dominik Pyrzyna (also known as Harcerz (Polish for Boy Scout)) is the former vocalist of Polish street punk band The Analogs.

References
  Analogs official website
  Band's official forum
  Jimmy Jazz Records

The Analogs members
Year of birth missing (living people)
Living people
21st-century Polish male singers
21st-century Polish singers